UFO: Extraterrestrials is a Microsoft Windows game aimed to be a spiritual sequel to the highly acclaimed X-COM: UFO Defense. Developed by Chaos Concept, the game incorporates a twist of the aliens defeating the humans on Earth. The game takes place on a human-colonized planet named Esperanza, where the alien threat has just arrived.

Gameplay
Gameplay in UFO: Extraterrestrials is similar to the original X-COM games. The player starts out with a base where they can add buildings, allocate scientists, equip soldiers and vehicles, manufacture equipment, etc.  Additional bases can be bought in different countries but are used mainly for housing interceptors.  Most buildings cannot be built in bases other than your main base.

The research side of the game is extensive, with about 120 projects to complete. These projects lead to improved weaponry, equipment, and understanding of the aliens.

When a UFO is spotted on the global view (or "geoscape") the player must send interceptors to shoot it down. Once the UFO has been shot down the player can send in a transport of soldiers to carry out a tactical mission to neutralize the aliens and capture their equipment.  Alien commanders can also be captured for interrogation.

The tactical missions are turn based, with no real-time option. The tactical squad that is sent to the crash site can include robots and tanks as well as soldiers; tanks and robots take up more space in the transport, however, and space is limited. Tactical missions can take approximately 30 minutes and there are about 200 pre-made levels.  When a mission begins a level is chosen according to the environment where the action takes place; the environment in missions is destructible.

The aliens can start a tactical mission if they attack any of the player's bases. Aliens can attack the player's base with UFOs, in which case it is a fight between your SAM sites and the UFO; if the SAM sites are destroyed, a tactical mission within your base will take place (or aliens will take it over in which case the player needs to send a transport ship). The aliens may also initiate a terror mission against any country; in this scenario the environment is a city with civilians in it.

The more aliens a soldier kills the more experience he receives (tanks and robots do not gain experience). There are rank insignias that show this and titles linked with each; when a soldier accumulates enough experience they go up a rank. Soldiers lose experience when they are recovering from injuries in the hospital; they can even lose a rank if they are in there long enough, but when a soldier comes back from the hospital they will gain experience faster for a time.

Reception
Reception of the game was generally mixed, with Metacritic listing it at 68 and GameRankings at 69.

The August 2008 edition of Pelit featured a retrospective of UFO: Extraterrestrials that focused on the effects mods have had on the game. Long-time reviewer Niko Nirvi, a strong admirer of the original X-COM: UFO Defense, described the original UFO: Extraterrestrials as a pleasant but visibly rushed substitute. He focused on "Bman's Ease of Use Mod 4.07 (fixed by Coasty)" as the prevailing merger of minor modifications, and pronounced it "the true successor of X-COM: UFO Defense" that "genuinely achieves some of its predecessor's magic." According to the magazine, the more visible features of Bman's mod are added weaponry, incorporation of the original UFO Defense enemies (although graphically by copying and enlarging the older game's sprites), improving AI and rebalancing the game mechanics by changing them towards those of UFO Defense.

Prequel
In September 2009, Chaos Concept unveiled a new website announcing a prequel, UFO2Extraterrestrials: Shadows over Earth, which has been in development since early 2009. Some of the announced improvements to the game include dynamic lighting (night missions complete with the need for light sources), and naval forces in the geoscape phase of the game (such as heavy aircraft carrier/cruisers that can launch fighters and defenses against UFOs).

After many failed release date attempts, Chaos Concept decided to withdraw a release date from the game's completely, but have since changed announced a new released date of Q4 2013 and the game was re-titled as UFO2Extraterrestrials: Battle for Mercury. With more delays it has been pushed back to Q3 2014 and then to Q1 2015, Q2 2015, Fall 2015, Q4 2016, Q2 2017, 2018, fall 2019 and September 2020. The game was eventually released on 15 June 2021.

References

External links

UFO: Extraterrestrials at MobyGames

2007 video games
Paradox Interactive games
Science fiction video games
Single-player video games
Tactical role-playing video games
Turn-based strategy video games
Turn-based tactics video games
Video games about extraterrestrial life
Video games developed in the Czech Republic
Video games with isometric graphics
Windows games
Windows-only games
Tri Synergy games